Pultenaea pedunculata, commonly known as matted bush-pea, is a species of flowering plant in the family Fabaceae and is endemic to south-eastern Australia. It is a prostrate, densely matted shrub with softly-hairy branches that often form roots, narrow elliptic leaves, and bright yellow and brick-red flowers.

Description
The flowers are usually arranged singly in leaf axils near the ends of branches.

Taxonomy
Pultenaea pedunculata was formally described in 1828 by English botanist William Jackson Hooker in the Botanical Magazine from specimens grown from seed collected by Charles Fraser. The specific epithet (pedunculata) means "pedunculate".

Distribution and habitat
Matted bush-pea grows in forest, woodland, heathland and grassland from near Sydney in New South Wales through Victoria and south-eastern South Australia, to Tasmania where it is common and widespread in dry, rocky places.

Conservation status
This species of pea is relatively common in Victoria, South Australia and Tasmania but is listed as "endangered" in New South Wales under the New South Wales Government Biodiversity Conservation Act. It is only known from three disjunct populations in that state.

References

pedunculata
Fabales of Australia
Flora of New South Wales
Flora of South Australia
Flora of Tasmania
Flora of Victoria (Australia)
Plants described in 1828
Taxa named by William Jackson Hooker